Josh Booth may refer to:
Josh Booth (born 1990), Australian rower
Josh Booth (politician) (born 1979), member of the West Virginia House of Delegates, appointed in 2021